Fuliang is a county in the northeast of Jiangxi province, People's Republic of China, bordering Anhui province to the north. It is under the administration of the prefecture-level city of Jingdezhen.

Administrative divisions
Fuliang County is divided to 9 towns and 9 townships.
9 towns

9 townships

References

External links 
 Homepage

County-level divisions of Jiangxi